Woodcutting may refer to:

Logging - cutting and loading of trees or logs onto trucks or skeleton cars
Woodcut, a relief printing technique in printmaking
Coppicing, a traditional method of woodland management

A woodcutter may refer to:
 A gatherer of firewood
 A lumberjack
 An artist producing woodcuts

See also
 Cutting (disambiguation)
 Cutter (disambiguation)
 Wood (disambiguation)